Rice Consolidated Independent School District is a public school district based in the community of Altair, Texas (USA).

In addition to Altair, the district serves the city of Eagle Lake, the communities of Garwood and Sheridan, as well as rural areas in southern Colorado County.

In 2009, the school district was rated "academically acceptable" by the Texas Education Agency.

Schools
Rice High School (grades 9-12, opened for 1970-1971 school year)
Rice Junior High School (grades 6-8)
Eagle Lake Intermediate School (grades 3-6)
Eagle Lake Primary School (grades PK-2)
Garwood School (grades K-6)
Sheridan School (grades K-6)

References

External links
 

School districts in Colorado County, Texas